Events from the year 1973 in Canada.

Incumbents

Crown 
 Monarch – Elizabeth II

Federal government 
 Governor General – Roland Michener
 Prime Minister – Pierre Trudeau
 Chief Justice – Gérald Fauteux (Quebec) (until 23 December) then Bora Laskin (Ontario)
 Parliament – 29th (from January 4)

Provincial governments

Lieutenant governors 
Lieutenant Governor of Alberta – Grant MacEwan
Lieutenant Governor of British Columbia – John Robert Nicholson (until February 13) then Walter Stewart Owen 
Lieutenant Governor of Manitoba – William John McKeag 
Lieutenant Governor of New Brunswick – Hédard Robichaud
Lieutenant Governor of Newfoundland – Ewart John Arlington Harnum 
Lieutenant Governor of Nova Scotia – Victor de Bedia Oland (until October 1) then Clarence Gosse
Lieutenant Governor of Ontario – William Ross Macdonald
Lieutenant Governor of Prince Edward Island – John George MacKay 
Lieutenant Governor of Quebec – Hugues Lapointe 
Lieutenant Governor of Saskatchewan – Stephen Worobetz

Premiers 
Premier of Alberta – Peter Lougheed
Premier of British Columbia – Dave Barrett 
Premier of Manitoba – Edward Schreyer
Premier of New Brunswick – Richard Hatfield
Premier of Newfoundland – Frank Moores
Premier of Nova Scotia – Gerald Regan
Premier of Ontario – Bill Davis 
Premier of Prince Edward Island – Alexander B. Campbell 
Premier of Quebec – Robert Bourassa 
Premier of Saskatchewan – Allan Blakeney

Territorial governments

Commissioners 
 Commissioner of Yukon – James Smith 
 Commissioner of Northwest Territories – Stuart Milton Hodgson

Events

January 25 - The Irish Stardust runs aground north of Vancouver Island, causing a large oil spill.
February 1 - Gerald Bouey succeeds Louis Rasminsky as Governor of the Bank of Canada.
February 5 - Work begins on the construction of the CN Tower
February 14-  Yukon Native Brotherhood tabled "Together today for our Children Tomorrow" marking the start of the Yukon Land Claims process
February 13 - The Gendron Report is issued; it recommends making French Quebec's only official language
February 15 - The Lester B. Pearson United World College of the Pacific is established in Victoria, British Columbia
April 2 - Montreal announces Canada's first lottery to help pay for the 1976 Summer Olympics
April 20 - Anik A2 is launched.
May 10 - The Montreal Canadiens win the Stanley Cup 4 games to 2 over the Chicago Blackhawks, Yvan Cournoyer is voted MVP. 
May 23 – The Royal Canadian Mounted Police celebrate their 100th anniversary.
July 7 - The Libertarian Party of Canada is founded.
August - Pride Week 1973, a national gay rights event, takes place simultaneously in several of Canada's largest metropolitan cities, including Toronto, Montreal, Ottawa and Vancouver.
August 20 - The 1973 Artistic Woodwork strike begins. It ends on December 5, 1973.
October 17 - OPEC dramatically raises the price of oil.  This is a boon to Alberta but hurts central Canada.
November 1 - Waterloo Lutheran University is renamed Wilfrid Laurier University
November 13 - A jury refuses to convict Henry Morgentaler for performing abortions
November 29 - The Canadian Intergovernmental Conference Secretariat is established.
December 7 - Canada sells its first CANDU Reactor to South Korea
First Air is founded

Arts and literature

New works
Farley Mowat - Tundra: Selections from the Great Accounts of Arctic Land Voyages
Donald Jack - That's Me in the Middle
Robert Kroetsch - Gone Indian
Elizabeth Goudie - Woman of Labrador
Raymond Fraser - The Black Horse Tavern

Awards
See 1973 Governor General's Awards for a complete list of winners and finalists for those awards.
Stephen Leacock Award: Donald Bell, Saturday Night at the Bagel Factory
Vicky Metcalf Award: Christie Harris

Radio
The Royal Canadian Air Farce is formed

Television
Alex Trebek moves to the United States to host The Wizard of Odds.

Sport
March 17 - Toronto Varsity Blues won their Seventh (and Fifth consecutive) University Cup by defeating the Saint Mary's Huskies 3 to 2. The Final game was played at Maple Leaf Gardens in Toronto
May 6 - New England Whalers won the First Avco Cup by defeating the Winnipeg Jets 4 game to 1. 
May 10 - Montreal Canadiens won their Eighteenth Stanley Cup by defeating the Chicago Black Hawks 4 Games to 2. Drummondville, Quebec's Yvan Cournoyer was awarded the Conn Smythe Trophy
May 12 - Ontario Hockey Association's Toronto Marlboros won their Sixth Memorial Cup by defeating the Quebec Major Junior Hockey League's Quebec Remparts 9-1. All games were played at the Montreal Forum. 
November 24 - Saint Mary's Huskies won their First Vanier Cup by defeating the McGill Redmen by a score of 14-6 in the 9th Vanier Cup played at Exhibition Stadium in Toronto
November 25 - Ottawa Rough Riders won their Eighth Grey Cup by defeating Edmonton Eskimos 22-18 in the 61st Grey Cup played at CNE Stadium in Toronto. Edmonton, Alberta's Garry Lefebvre becomes First Canadian-born Grey Cup Most Valuable Canadian.

Births

January to March
January 3 - Robert Baird, swimmer
January 4 - Greg de Vries, ice hockey player
January 6 - Scott Ferguson, ice hockey player and coach
January 8 - Robert Braknis, swimmer
January 11 - Sarah Forbes, field hockey player
January 13 - Dana Anderson, field hockey player
January 16 - Nathalie Giguère, swimmer
January 26 - Larissa Lowing, artistic gymnast
February 4 - Manny Legacé, ice hockey player
February 5 - Marty O'Donnell, boxer
February 12 - Tara Strong, actress and businesswoman
February 28 - Eric Lindros, ice hockey player
March 1 - Ryan Peake, lead guitarist and backing vocalist
March 3 - Sean Campbell, field hockey player
March 13 - Allison Higson, swimmer
March 24 - Philippe Boucher, ice hockey player
March 31 - Ian Goldberg, cryptographer and cypherpunk

April to June
April 5 - Kristin Topham, swimmer
April 23 - Derek Armstrong, ice hockey player
April 25 - Paige Gordon, diver
May 4
 Matthew Barnaby, ice hockey player
 John Madden, ice hockey player
May 12 - Robert Tinkler, Canadian voice actor and screenwriter
May 13 - Mike Beres, badminton player
May 14 - Natalie Appleton, singer
May 25 - Josée Corbeil, volleyball player
June 1 - Jeff Schiebler, long-distance runner
June 25 - René Corbet, Canadian ice hockey player

July to September
July 3 - Adrian Aucoin, ice hockey player
July 3 - Melanie Jans, squash player
July 13 - Gavin Hassett, rower and Olympic silver medallist
July 19 - Scott Walker, ice hockey player
July 22 - Rufus Wainwright, singer-songwriter
July 27 - Niki Jenkins, judoka
July 27 - David McLellan, swimmer
August 24 - Andrew Brunette, ice hockey player
August 28 - Kirby Morrow, voice actor (d. 2020)
August 29 - Jessica Holmes, comedian and actress
August 31 - Scott Niedermayer, ice hockey player
September 6 - Greg Rusedski, tennis player
September 18 - Paul Brousseau, ice hockey player
September 26 – Lainey Lui, television personality, co-host of etalk

October to December
October 3 - Neve Campbell, actress
October 5 – Annabelle Chvostek, singer-songwriter
October 18 – Alex Tagliani, racing driver
October 23 - Scott Mosher, field hockey player
October 30 - Adam Copeland, wrestler
November 10 - Iain Brambell, rower and Olympic bronze medallist
November 12 - Keith Morgan, judoka
November 14 - Moka Only, rapper and producer (Swollen Members)
November 27 - Mike Oliver, field hockey player
November 30 - Carla Somerville, field hockey player and coach
December 1 - Brian Froud, actor and voice actor
December 5 - Shalom Harlow, model and actress
December 14 
Sue Armstrong, field hockey player
Tomasz Radzinski, soccer player
December 20 
David Nedohin, curler
Cory Stillman, ice hockey player and coach
December 22 - Annie Pelletier, diver and Olympic bronze medallist
December 25 - Alexandre Trudeau, filmmaker and journalist
December 31 - Curtis Myden, swimmer

Deaths

January to June
January 4 - George A. Drew, politician and 14th Premier of Ontario (b.1894)
February 5 - Wilbert Ross Aylesworth, politician
February 22 - Jean-Jacques Bertrand, politician and 21st Premier of Quebec (b.1916)
March 2 - John Percy Page, 8th Lieutenant Governor of Alberta (b. 1887)

March 11 - Tim Buck, politician and long-time leader of the Communist Party of Canada (b.1891)
May 4 - Leslie Frost, politician and 16th Premier of Ontario (b.1895)
May 6 - Ernest MacMillan, conductor and composer (b.1893)
June 14 - Henry Herbert Stevens, politician and businessman (b.1878)

July to December

July 18 - Christine Demeter, murder victim (b.1940)
July 25 - Louis St. Laurent, politician and 12th Prime Minister of Canada (b.1882)
July 27 - James Macdonnell, soldier, lawyer and politician (b.1884)
December - Alfred Fuller, businessman (b.1885)

Full date unknown
William George Bock, politician (b.1884)

See also
 1973 in Canadian television
 List of Canadian films of 1973

References

 
Years of the 20th century in Canada
Canada
1973 in North America